Edgar A. Igelheart House is a historic home located at Evansville, Indiana. It was designed by Edward Joseph Thole and built in 1932. It is a French Renaissance château style painted brick dwelling consisting of a rectangular central section with flanking wings. It has a slate hipped roof.  Also on the property are the contributing two sections of the Lant House, stable, garage (c. 1932), and cow barn.

It was added to the National Register of Historic Places in 1990.

References

Houses on the National Register of Historic Places in Indiana
Renaissance Revival architecture in Indiana
Houses completed in 1932
Houses in Evansville, Indiana
National Register of Historic Places in Evansville, Indiana